Miranda Layne Granger (born April 13, 1992) is an American mixed martial artist who competes in the strawweight division. A professional since 2017, she most notably competed in the Ultimate Fighting Championship.

Background
The daughter of Gordy and Cheryl Granger, Miranda was born and raised in Everett, Washington. She attended Snohomish High School for two years before transferring to Glacier Peak High School from where she graduated in 2010. Besides training taekwondo, she lettered overall ten times in soccer, basketball and softball. After the high school, Miranda continued playing softball and basketball while attending Everett Community College for a year before transferring to Bellevue College where she focused in softball.

After the college she returned to martial arts and begun to train kickboxing before picking up other disciplines of mixed martial arts.

Mixed martial arts career

Early career
Granger made her professional debut on August 25, 2017, and amassed a 3-0 record before she was scheduled to face Amy Montenegro for the vacant DFC Strawweight Championship. She won the fight by a first-round submission.

Granger was subsequently scheduled to face Jamie Colleen at CFFC 71 on December 14, 2018, in her Cage Fury Fighting Championships debut. She won the fight by a first-round submission. Granger was then scheduled to face Heloisa Azevedo for the inaugural Cage Fury FC Strawweight Championship on May 25, 2019. She won the fight by a first-round submission, extending her finishing streak to six consecutive fights.

On September 3, 2019, it was announced that Granger had signed with the UFC.

Ultimate Fighting Championship

Granger made her UFC debut at flyweight against Hannah Goldy on August 3, 2019 at UFC on ESPN: Covington vs. Lawler. She won the fight via unanimous decision.

Granger made her return to strawweight on December 21, 2019 at UFC on ESPN+ 23 as an injury replacement for Veronica Macedo against Amanda Lemos. She lost the fight via technical submission.

Granger faced Ashley Yoder on November 14, 2020 at UFC Fight Night: Felder vs. dos Anjos. She lost the fight via unanimous decision.

Granger faced Cory McKenna on August 6, 2022 at UFC on ESPN 40. she lost the fight via a shoulder choke in round two.

After her loss, it was announced that Granger was no longer on the UFC roster.

Personal life
Granger has been married to a fellow mixed martial artist Kaden Barish since 2016.

Championships and achievements 

 Dominate Fighting Championship
 DFC Strawweight Championship (One Time) 
 Cage Fury Fighting Championships
 Cage Fury FC Strawweight Championship (One Time)

Mixed martial arts record

|-
|Loss
|align=center|7–3
|Cory McKenna
|Submission (shoulder choke)
|UFC on ESPN: Santos vs. Hill
|
|align=center| 2
|align=center|1:03
|Las Vegas, Nevada, United States
|
|-
|Loss
|align=center|7–2
|Ashley Yoder
| Decision (unanimous)
|UFC Fight Night: Felder vs. dos Anjos
|
|align=center|3
|align=center|5:00
|Las Vegas, Nevada, United States
|
|-
|Loss
|align=center|7–1
|Amanda Lemos
| Technical Submission (rear-naked choke)
|UFC Fight Night: Edgar vs. The Korean Zombie
|
|align=center|1
|align=center|3:43
|Busan, South Korea
|
|-
| Win
| align=center| 7–0
| Hannah Goldy
|Decision (unanimous)
|UFC on ESPN: Covington vs. Lawler 
|
|align=center|3
|align=center|5:00
|Newark, New Jersey, United States
| 
|-
| Win
| align=center| 6–0
| Heloisa Azevedo
|Submission (guillotine choke)
|Cage Fury Fighting Championships 75
|
|align=Center|1
|align=center|0:41
|Coachella, California, United States
| 
|-
| Win
| align=center| 5–0
| Jamie Colleen
| Submission (armbar)
| Cage Fury Fighting Championships 71
| 
| align=center| 1
| align=center| 2:11
| Atlantic City, New Jersey, United States
| 
|-
| Win
| align=center| 4–0
| Amy Montenegro
| Submission (guillotine choke)
| Dominate Fighting Championship 2
| 
| align=center| 1
| align=center| 2:45
| Tacoma, Washington, United States
| 
|-
| Win
| align=center| 3–0
| Jamie Thorton
| TKO
| COGA 61: Rumble on the Ridge 41
| 
| align=center| 2
| align=center| 2:51
| Snoqualmie, Washington, United States
| 
|-
| Win
| align=center| 2–0
| Ivana Coleman
| Submission (rear-naked choke)
| COGA 60: Supreme Showdown 3
| 
| align=center| 1
| align=center| 4:29
| Tulalip, Washington, United States
| 
|-
| Win
| align=center| 1–0
| Nikki Lowe
| Submission (armbar)
| COGA 58: Summer Showdown 4
| 
| align=center| 1
| align=center| 2:30
| Tulalip, Washington, United States
|

See also 
 List of female mixed martial artists

References

External links 
  
 

1992 births
Living people
American female mixed martial artists
American female taekwondo practitioners
Sportspeople from Everett, Washington
Mixed martial artists from Washington (state)
Strawweight mixed martial artists
Mixed martial artists utilizing taekwondo
Ultimate Fighting Championship female fighters
21st-century American women